was a professional wrestling event promoted by World Wonder Ring Stardom. The event took place on August 21, 2022, in Nagoya, Japan at the Aichi Prefectural Gymnasium with a limited attendance due in part to the ongoing COVID-19 pandemic at the time.

Background
The show featured eight professional wrestling matches that resulted from scripted storylines, where wrestlers portrayed villains, heroes, or less distinguishable characters in the scripted events that built tension and culminated in a wrestling match or series of matches. The event's press conference took place on August 3, 2022, and was broadcast live on Stardom's YouTube channel.

Event
New Japan Pro Wrestling's El Desperado and Taichi were presented as guest commentators for the night. The preshow match in which Hanan defended the Future of Stardom Championship for the ninth time in a row against Miyu Amasaki was broadcast live on Stardom's YouTube channel. The first match of the main card saw Maika picking up a victory over Hina. Maika was initially scheduled to team up with Himeka to face Giulia & Mai Sakurai in a tag match, but since Kairi was sidelined due to COVID issues, Himeka replaced the latter in the Wonder of Stardom Championship against Saya Kamitani, leaving Maika to be rescheduled into another match. The third match was also redesigned as Mirai & Ami Sourei faced Giulia & Mai Sakurai and Rina & Ruaka in a successful effort. The fourth match presented Utami Hayashishita, Lady C and the High Speed Champion AZM taking a victory over the SWA World Champion Mayu Iwatani, Momo Kohgo and Saya Iida. In the fifth match, Saki Kashima, Momo Watanabe & Momo Watanabe successfully defended the Artist of Stardom Championship for the third time in a row against Unagi Sayaka, Mina Shirakawa & Saki. The sixth match saw Tam Nakano & Natsupoi defeating Hazuki & Koguma to win the Goddess of Stardom Championship. Mirai & Ami Sourei stepped up to challenge them for the titles at a show from September 11, 2022. Next, Saya Kamitani defeated Himeka to mark her ninth defense of the Wonder of Stardom Championship.

The main event saw Syuri successfully defending the World of Stardom Championship for the eighth time in a row against the inaugural "red belt" champion, Nanae Takahashi.

Results

Notes

References

External links
Page Stardom World

2022 in professional wrestling
World Wonder Ring Stardom shows
Women's professional wrestling shows
World Wonder Ring Stardom
Events in Nagoya
Professional wrestling in Japan